Syarhey Irkha (born 25 March 1984) is a Belarusian former professional footballer.

External links

1984 births
Living people
Belarusian footballers
Association football midfielders
Belarusian expatriate footballers
Expatriate footballers in Lithuania
FC Slavia Mozyr players
FC Torpedo-BelAZ Zhodino players
FC Vitebsk players
FC Smorgon players
FK Tauras Tauragė players